The West Freemason Street Area Historic District is a national historic district located at Norfolk, Virginia. It encompasses 48 contributing buildings in a primarily residential section on the western edge of the center city of Norfolk. It developed between the late-18th and early-20th centuries and includes notable examples of the Federal, Greek Revival, and Late Victorian styles.  Notable buildings include Kenmure House Glisson House, Whittle House, McCullough Row, and the Camp-Hubard house.  Located in the district is the separately listed Allmand-Archer House.

It was listed on the National Register of Historic Places in 1972.

References

External links

Whittle House, 225 West Freemason Street, Norfolk, Norfolk, VA: 1 photo, 5 measured drawings, and 3 data pages at Historic American Buildings Survey

Houses on the National Register of Historic Places in Virginia
Historic districts on the National Register of Historic Places in Virginia
National Register of Historic Places in Norfolk, Virginia
Federal architecture in Virginia
Greek Revival architecture in Virginia
Victorian architecture in Virginia
Neighborhoods in Norfolk, Virginia
Houses in Norfolk, Virginia